The DuPage County Highway System is a county-maintained system of arterial county highways in DuPage County, Illinois, United States. They are marked with the standard M1-6 pentagon-shaped highway marker on the base of traffic signals at intersections with other county highways. They are not marked on any freeway or tollway exits or signed with separate reassurance markers. In addition, although concurrencies of county highways exist in the county, they too are not explicitly signed as such.

County Highways 47, 48, 49, 55 and 57 all refer to segments of the Illinois Prairie Path and the Great Western Trail, major bike trails through DuPage County. No motorized traffic is allowed on these trails/highways.

Route list

References 

Transportation in DuPage County, Illinois
 z